Isla del Rey may refer to:

Isla del Rey (Chile)
Isla del Rey (Panama)
 Isla del Rey (Chafarinas), one of the Spanish archipelago of Chafarinas
 Illa del Rei (Isla del Rey in Spanish, historically Hospital Island in English), a small islet off Port Mahon
, a Panamanian cargo ship in service during 1966